Ferik may refer to:
 Ferik (rank), a military rank of the Ottoman Empire
 Ferik (village), a village in Armavir Province, Armenia